St. Mary's is a census-designated place (CDP) located in and governed by Clear Creek County, Colorado, United States. The CDP is a part of the Denver–Aurora–Lakewood, CO Metropolitan Statistical Area. The population of the St. Mary's CDP was 333 at the United States Census 2020. The St. Mary's Glacier Metropolitan District and the St. Mary's Glacier Water & Sanitation District provide services. The Idaho Springs post office (Zip Code 80452) serves the area.

Geography

Demographics

Historic ski area
 St. Mary's Glacier Ski Area

See also

 List of census-designated places in Colorado

References

External links

 St. Mary's Glacier Metropolitan District
 Saint Mary's Glacier
 Saint Mary's Glacier Resort

Census-designated places in Clear Creek County, Colorado
Census-designated places in Colorado
Denver metropolitan area